The following is a list of notable killings, including terrorists attributed to armed groups under the control of the Sri Lankan government – Army, Navy, Air Force, Police and paramilitary groups (Home Guards/Civil Defence Force, Eelam People's Democratic Party, Tamil Makkal Viduthalai Pulikal etc.).

Killings in chronological order

Notes

References

 
 
People murdered in Sri Lanka
Sri Lankan Civil War-related lists
 
Military
Sri Lanka